Ellen Nnana Ntsitse Molekane (born 2 August 1953) is the current Deputy Minister of State Security in South Africa. She was appointed to the portfolio on 25 May 2014. She is a member of the African National Congress.

See also

African Commission on Human and Peoples' Rights
Constitution of South Africa
History of the African National Congress
Politics in South Africa
Provincial governments of South Africa

References

1953 births
Living people
People from Soweto
South African politicians